The Glenbrook Railway Residence is a heritage-listed railway residence located at Great Western Highway, Glenbrook, City of Blue Mountains, New South Wales, Australia. It is also known as Railway Residence. The property is owned by Ampol Pty Ltd. It was added to the New South Wales State Heritage Register on 2 April 1999.

History

Heritage listing 
Glenbrook Railway Residence was listed on the New South Wales State Heritage Register on 2 April 1999.

See also 

Glenbrook railway station

References

Attribution

External links

New South Wales State Heritage Register
Glenbrook, New South Wales
Railway stations in New South Wales
Houses in New South Wales
Articles incorporating text from the New South Wales State Heritage Register
Buildings and structures in the Blue Mountains (New South Wales)